Atlas Saarikoski (born Akuliina Saarikoski, 1982) is a Finnish social activist, journalist and anarchist.

Career

Saarikoski has been involved in various civil rights movements, and has taken part in debates on immigration, animal rights, anarchism, feminism and sexual politics. Saarikoski has written for the Green left Voima newspaper. She is the editor-in-chief of the feminist magazine Tulva.

Viewpoints

Saarikoski has criticized the  citizens' initiative, and argued that gay marriage is a bad political goal. She has argued that gay marriage is shaping into an endpoint for gay rights. She has stated that marriage is based on heteronormativity and norms concerning the nuclear family in addition to strengthening gender-based power relations, and marriage can not be taken apart from the history of racial hygiene and chastity. Saarikoski has also criticized FEMEN for its anti-Islamic stance. Saarikoski supports separate physical education classes for boys and girls in Finland. She is a pacifist.

See also

Seta (organization)
Anarchism and issues related to love and sex

References

Further reading

External links
Atlas Saarikoski's Uusi Suomi Puheenvuoro blog 
Punakynä blog 
Bensaa liekkeihin! at Yle Areena 
Kyse ei ole vihasta, kyse on vallasta at Yle 

1982 births
Finnish feminists
Finnish LGBT journalists
Finnish LGBT rights activists
Living people
21st-century Finnish LGBT people
Finnish women activists